There have been two baronetcies created for a person with the surname Clifford.

The Clifford Baronetcy, of the Navy, was created for Augustus William James Clifford, the illegitimate son of the 5th Duke of Devonshire (as son of the 6th Baroness Clifford and himself the 7th one) on 4 August 1838 in the Baronetage of the United Kingdom. It has become extinct at the death of the 4th Baronet on 22 November 1895.

The Clifford Baronetcy, of Flaxbourne in New Zealand was created for Charles Clifford, a grandnephew of Hugh Clifford, 4th Baron Clifford of Chudleigh (and nephew of Sir Thomas Clifford-Constable, Bt) on 16 July 1887 in the Baronetage of the United Kingdom. As of 2020, the baronetcy is held by the 7th Baronet.

Clifford baronets, of the Navy (1838)
Sir Augustus William James Clifford, 1st Baronet (1788–1877)
Sir William John Cavendish Clifford, 2nd Baronet (1814–1882)
Sir Robert Cavendish Spencer Clifford, 3rd Baronet (1815–1892)
Sir Charles Cavendish Clifford, 4th Baronet (1821–1895) extinct 1895

Clifford baronets, of Flaxbourne, New Zealand (1887)
Sir Charles Clifford, 1st Baronet (1813–1893)
Sir George Hugh Charles Clifford, 2nd Baronet (1847–1930)
Sir Charles Lewis Clifford, 3rd Baronet (1885–1938)
Sir Walter Lovelace Clifford, 4th Baronet (1852–1944)
Sir Lewis Arthur Joseph Clifford, 5th Baronet (1896–1970)
Sir Roger Charles Joseph Gerard Clifford, 6th Baronet (1910–1982)
Sir Roger Joseph Clifford, 7th Baronet (born 1936)

The heir presumptive is his twin brother Charles Joseph Clifford (born 1936). There are no further heirs to the title.

References

See also
Clifford-Constable baronets

Baronetcies in the Baronetage of the United Kingdom
Extinct baronetcies in the Baronetage of the United Kingdom
New Zealand recipients of British titles